The Musandam Peninsula, locally known as Ruus Al Jibal, is a peninsula that forms the northeastern point of the Arabian Peninsula. It is located to the south of the Strait of Hormuz between the Persian Gulf and Gulf of Oman. It is inhabited by the Shihuh tribe and is mainly governed by Oman as the Musandam Governorate with certain parts governed by the United Arab Emirates, including Ras Al Khaimah and parts of Dibba.

Climate, geology and geography 

Land features include the Western Hajar Mountains. Since these are the northernmost of the Hajar range, they and the peninsula are referred to as Ruʾūs al-Jibāl. The largest Wadi in Mussandam is Wadi Bih, which forms the central drainage basin.

The highest Mountain in Mussandam, and Ru'us al Jibal, is Jebel Harim, which measures  from sea level. 

During winter, the region can be fairly cool, particularly the mountains of Jais, Yanas and Mebrah.

Fauna and flora 

Fauna include the Ruus al Jibal fan-footed gecko, Arabian tahr and caracal. It is unknown if the Arabian leopard is still present.

References

External links 
 Hiking: The Highest Points in the UAE